William Fleming Turnbull (26 January 1879 — 26 December 1959) was a Scottish first-class cricketer.

Turnbull was born at Falkirk in January 1879. He was educated at Daniel Stewart’s College. A club cricketer for Stewart's Former Pupils, Turnbull made his debut in first-class cricket for Scotland against Ireland at Glasgow in 1911. He made three further first-class appearances for Scotland, playing against the touring Indians in 1911 at Galashiels, and twice against the touring South Africans in 1912 at Glasgow and Edinburgh. In his four first-class appearances, Turnbull scored 78 runs at an average of 13.00, with a highest score of 41 not out. Outside of cricket, Turnbull was employed as a club master at Turnhouse Golf Club. In July 1935, he was fined 10 shillings for driving a motor vehicle without a license. Turnbull died at Edinburgh in December 1959.

References

External links
 

1879 births
1959 deaths
Sportspeople from Falkirk
People educated at Stewart's Melville College
Scottish cricketers